The 2018 Remus F3 Cup was the 37th Austria Formula 3 Cup season and the sixth Remus F3 Cup season.

Teams and drivers
All Cup cars were built between 2008 and 2011, while Trophy cars were built between 1992 and 2007.

Numbers used at Remus F3 Cup events listed; numbers used at races run to F2000 Italian Formula Trophy regulations displayed in tooltips.

Calendar and race results
Round 2 to 4 and 6 (Red Bull Ring, Monza, Most and Imola) were held together with the F2000 Italian Formula Trophy, however, all F2000  competitors would be ineligible to score Remus F3 Cup points.

Championship standings

Cup

Trophy

Drexler Automotive Formula 3 Cup
All German drivers or drivers that use a Drexler Automotive gearbox are eligible to score points for the Drexler Automotive Formula 3 Cup.

† Although Wachter and Martucci weren't participating in any Remus F3 Cup classes, they were eligible to score points in the Drexler Automotive Formula 3 Cup.

HORAG Swiss Formula 3 Cup

† Antoine Bottiroli was competing in F2000 Italian Trophy at the Red Bull Ring races.

References

External links
Website of the AFR Cups [German]

Austria Formula 3 Cup
Remus F3 Cup
Remus F3 Cup